Iferhounene (French:Iferhounène)(Arabic:ايفرحونن)(TifinaƔ:ⵉⴼⴻⵔⵀⵓⵏⴻⵏ) is a town and commune in Tizi Ouzou Province in northern Algeria. It is known to be close to the city of Ain El Hammam and is traversed through daily by Tizi Ouzou commuters. It is also known for its snowy climate during the winter

It has grown exponentially over the 21st century in terms of modernization, however its surrounding villages have suffered greatly from this development because of people moving in Iferhounene for improvements in transportation and basic commodities. Therefore, reducing the village populations and causing the death of some villages like Ait Hammou.

References

Communes of Tizi Ouzou Province
Tizi Ouzou Province